Heidi E. Scheuermann is a Republican politician who was elected and currently serves in the Vermont House of Representatives. She represents the Lamoille-1 Representative District. Before being a State Congresswoman, she served on the Town of Stowe's Select Board from 2004 to 2010, which included two terms as chair of the Select Board.

Early life 
Scheuermann was born in Burlington, Vermont. She grew up in the Village of Stowe and attended Stowe High School. She earned her Bachelors in Arts Education from St. Louis University, and then spent three years from 1994 to 1997 in the United States Peace Corps. During her time in the Peace Corps, she taught English as a Second Language in Klodzko, Poland.

National Politics 
On December 11, 2013, then Lieutenant Governor Phil Scott and Heidi Scheuermann hosted then New Jersey Governor Chris Christie at the state Republican Party's 'Welcome Winter Gala'. The event was held at the Champlain Valley Expo in Essex Junction. Scheuermann told Vtdigger "We're looking forward to hearing and learning from Gov. Christie about how he's been able to do it in a blue state. We have a lot of similarities. We're excited to hear his message."

Presidential Politics 
Scheuermann has endorsed Libertarian Party candidate Gary Johnson for the 2016 presidential election.

Electoral history 
Bold=Won election

References



Living people
Republican Party members of the Vermont House of Representatives
Women state legislators in Vermont
Year of birth missing (living people)
21st-century American politicians
21st-century American women politicians